Eurychilopterella is a genus of plant bugs in the family Miridae. There are about nine described species in Eurychilopterella.

Species
These nine species belong to the genus Eurychilopterella:
 Eurychilopterella barberi Knight, 1927
 Eurychilopterella brunneata Knight, 1927
 Eurychilopterella chiapas Stonedahl in Stonedahl, Lattin & Razafimahatratra, 1997
 Eurychilopterella jalisco Stonedahl in Stonedahl, Lattin & Razafimahatratra, 1997
 Eurychilopterella keltoni Stonedahl in Stonedahl, Lattin & Razafimahatratra, 1997
 Eurychilopterella luridula Reuter, 1909
 Eurychilopterella pacifica Stonedahl in Stonedahl, Lattin & Razafimahatratra, 1997
 Eurychilopterella polhemusi Stonedahl in Stonedahl, Lattin & Razafimahatratra, 1997
 Eurychilopterella tlaxacala Stonedahl in Stonedahl, Lattin & Razafimahatratra, 1997

References

Further reading

External links

 

Miridae genera
Articles created by Qbugbot
Deraeocorini